Roger Bean (born 18 November 1945) is a British biathlete. He competed in the 20 km individual event at the 1968 Winter Olympics.

References

1945 births
Living people
British male biathletes
Olympic biathletes of Great Britain
Biathletes at the 1968 Winter Olympics
Place of birth missing (living people)